Gibberula zambranoae is a species of sea snail, a marine gastropod mollusk, in the family Cystiscidae. It is named after María Zambrano.

Description
The length of the shell attains 3 mm.

Distribution
This marine species occurs off Guadeloupe.

References

zambranoae
Gastropods described in 2015